This is a list of lost expeditions.

All parties presumed lost

One or more surviving members

References 

 Williams, Glyn. Arctic Labyrinth: The Quest for the Northwest Passage. London, England: Penguin UK, 2009. ISBN 978-0-14-193258-3

Wright, Ed. Lost Explorers: Adventurers Who Disappeared Off The Face Of The Earth. Millers Point, Australia: Pier 9, 2008.

Further reading
Balkan, Evan. Vanished!: Explorers Forever Lost. Birmingham, Alabama: Menasha Ridge Press, 2008.

External links
Famous Expeditions That Fell Off the Map at History.com 

Geography-related lists
Lists of expeditions